Events from the year 2010 in Croatia.

Incumbents
President – Stjepan Mesić (until 18 February), Ivo Josipović (starting 19 February)
Prime Minister – Jadranka Kosor
Speaker – Luka Bebić

Events
10 January – Second round of the presidential election is held. Ivo Josipović beats Milan Bandić winning 60.3% of the vote.
18 February – Ivo Josipović officially inaugurated as President at St. Mark's Square in Zagreb.
10 December – Former Prime Minister Ivo Sanader is arrested in Austria over charges of corruption

Arts and literature
6 March – Girl group Feminnem win the 2010 Eurovision national pre-selection competition.
27 May – Feminnem perform in the Eurovision Song Contest 2010 semi-final in Oslo but fail to progress to the finals.
10–24 July – The 2010 Pula Film Festival is held. The film Just Between Us directed by Rajko Grlić wins the Big Golden Arena for Best Film award.

Sport

3 and 6 January – The Snow Queen Trophy slalom race held at Sljeme in Zagreb.
1–7 February – The 2010 PBZ Zagreb Indoors tennis tournament held in Zagreb.
27 March – The K-1 ColliZion 2010 Croatia martial arts event held in Split.
10–16 May – The 2010 Zagreb Open tennis tournament held in Zagreb.
26 July–1 August – The 2010 ATP Studena Croatia Open Umag tennis tournament is held in Umag.
29 August – The 2010 Speedway Grand Prix of Croatia held in Donji Kraljevec.
1 September – The Hanžeković Memorial international track and field event is held in Zagreb.
4–5 September – The 2010 IAAF Continental Cup international track and field sporting event is held in Split.
9–11 December – The 2010 Golden Spin of Zagreb international figure skating competition is held in Zagreb.

Deaths
January 14 – Ante Babaja, film director (born 1927).
February 2 – Svetozar Kurepa, mathematician (born 1929)
February 19 – Mladen Veža, painter (born 1916).
July 24 – Mia Oremović, actress (born 1918).
July 26 – Mićun Jovanić, footballer (born 1952).
August 12 – Velimir Kljaić, handball coach (born 1946).
August 22 – Stjepan Bobek, footballer (born 1923).
October 7 – Milka Planinc, politician (born 1924).
October 25 – Vesna Parun, poet (born 1922).

See also
2010 in Croatian television

References

 
Years of the 21st century in Croatia
2010s in Croatia
Croatia
Croatia